Kim Seon-ho (born May 8, 1986) is a South Korean actor. He began his career on stage and appeared in numerous plays before making his screen debut in 2017 with Good Manager. He rose to prominence with the television series Start-Up (2020) and gained more recognition for his main role in Hometown Cha-Cha-Cha (2021), which aired on tvN and Netflix. In 2021, he was selected as Gallup Korea's Television Actor of the Year.

Early years and education 
Kim grew up as an only son in Bongcheon-dong, a neighborhood in Seoul. Self-described as introverted and insecure in his childhood and teenage years, Kim attributed the cause to a traumatic incident in his childhood; his mother was stabbed with a knife in a home robbery, whilst Kim narrowly escaping the attack by hiding under his bed. He slowly overcame his trauma through acting, whilst enrolling in acting academy in his third year of high school.

After finishing high school, Kim studied at the Seoul Institute of the Arts where he received a degree from the Department of Broadcasting and Entertainment. During his studies, he joined his campus theater club . In the theater club, Kim started to act in plays such as My Town, The Seagull, and Chunpung's Wife.

Kim did his mandatory military enlistment in 2007, before his debut as actor. He served as assistant instructor at Nonsan Army Training Center and later changed to a public service worker. His military life has broaden his world-view.

Career

2009–2016: Theatrical work 
Kim first professional stage role was in open-run New Boeing Boeing (an adaptation of the French play of the same name) in 2009, which he reprised in 2013. In 2012, Kim acted the role Dr. Watson to Korean production of William Gillette's play Sherlock Holmes. In the end of 2013, Kim acted as main lead in play Words I Couldn't Say for 7 Years, written and directed by Park Jung-in, at Daehakro Moonlight Theater. In March 2014, Kim reprised his role at the Figaro Art Hall in Jung-gu, Ulsan.

Then in autumn of the same year, Kim was triple-cast in 10th season of Aligator Theater Company's play Rooftop House Cat. Kim won the role of protagonist Lee Kyung-min after beating around 200 hopefuls in an open audition. Then, He was recast for following season 11th and season 12th. In 2015 he was cast for another title role in the Aligator Theater Company's play Purpose of Love. Both plays are popular Daehakro (comparable to Off-Broadway) romantic comedy open-run plays. 

Later, he expanded his repertoire with darker roles in limited-run plays produced by Aligator Theater Company. In 2015, Kim auditioned for Austin role in Korean revival of Sam Shepard's acclaimed True West, directed by Oh Man-seok. He was triple-cast as Austin with Lee Hyun-wook and Moon Sung-il. They acted alternately opposite Jeon Seok-ho, Kim Jun-won, and Lee Dae-il, who played Austin older brother Lee. According to Interpark, the play ranked first for theater ticket sales at the same time as ticket sales was opened. It was performed at the University Road A Art Hall from August 13th to November 1st. Also in 2015, he played Valentin in Korean stage adaptation of Manuel Puig's play Kiss of the Spider Woman at the Art One Theater, Seoul. Kim found minor success and nick-named as theater idol.

In 2016, Kim challenged himself to audition for multiple roles in Theater Ganda's production of John Cariani's omnibus play, Almost, Maine. Kim was cast after breaking through the competition rate of 200 to 1 and performed as part of second team from April 2012. Also in 2016, Kim did two back-to-back plays with Aligator Theater Company. He reprised his role as Austin in Korean encore performance of playwright Sam Shepard's play True West Return. Then appeared in 2016 revival of the hit play Closer, by Patrick Marber, opposite Bae Seong-woo, Kim So-jin, and Park So-dam. His explosive energy onstage earned him critical recognition. In November 2016, Kim joined Park Dong-wook's playVoice of Millenium. The play was produced by Space to Create, a theater company founded by Ahn Hyuk-won and Jeon Seok-ho. Directed by Park Seon-hee, it was performed from November 5 to December 31 at Dongsoong Art Center Dongsoong Small Theater.

2017–2019: Television debut 

Kim made his screen debut at the beginning of 2017 in the KBS2 office drama Good Manager, after auditioning at the suggestion of producer  who watched his performance in the play Closer. Kim's next project Strongest Deliveryman, for which he initially auditioned for a supporting role, marked his first appearance in a main role onscreen. Both roles earned him nomination for  Best New Actor Award at the 2017 KBS Drama Awards.

Later in 2017, Kim starred opposite Jo Jung-suk and in MBC action comedy Two Cops as a sly conman. He originally auditioned for a supporting role, however the director upgraded him to second lead after re-watching his audition clip. For his performance, Kim earned two awards at the 2017 MBC Drama Awards. While the drama was still airing, he reprised his role onstage as Valentin in encore performance of Kiss of the Spider Woman.

In 2018, Kim portrayed the lead role of a painter in the drama special You Drive Me Crazy, which had a four-episode broadcast in May. In April, He also starred in the historical drama 100 Days My Prince, as Jung Jae-yoon, a smart yangban with lower status as illegitimate son of a concubine, who also suffers from prosopagnosia. It was his first historical and preproduction drama, which also became one of the highest-rated series in Korean cable television history. In September that year, Kim joined  after the termination of his contract with Aligator Theater Company.

In March 2019, Kim played an aspiring singer in the JTBC comedy series Welcome to Waikiki 2. Kim with Shin Hyun-soo, Ahn So-hee, Moon Ga-young, and Kim Ye-won joined Lee Yi-kyung from season 1. In October the same year, he starred in the tvN investigative crime drama Catch the Ghost opposite veteran actress Moon Geun-young, in his second leading role in a full-length series following Welcome to Waikiki 2. On November 5, Kim joined the cast in fourth season of the KBS2 reality show 2 Days & 1 Night; he received the Rookie Award at the 2020 KBS Entertainment Awards for his work on the show.

In his final project of 2019, Kim appeared in the play Memory in dream. He again proved his ticket sales power. Within five minutes after the ticket window was opened, all tickets for the episodes he appeared, in the first, second, and third rounds, were sold out. Kim performed a total of 33 performances and recorded a cumulative audience of about 4,700 theater audiences.

2020–present: Breakthrough, mainstream success, and back to the theater 

Kim returned to the small screen in October 2020 through the tvN drama Start-Up. His portrayal of a start-up investor with a tragic past was well-received by viewers and garnered him a nomination for the Baeksang Arts Award for Best Supporting Actor – Television. During the airing of Start-Up, Kim topped the monthly brand reputation ranking index by the Korean Business Research Institute and experienced a surge in popularity domestically and internationally.

He made his comeback to theatre in January 2021 in Jang Jin's two-hander play Ice, in which he played a detective trying to inculpate a young man in a murder case. The play performed at S Theater, Sejong Center for the Performing Arts. It was reported that at the same time as the ticket opening date, all of Kim Seon-ho's appearances were sold out.

It was a surprise gift for Kim prepared for his fans, expressing his feelings through the lyric and music video. On May 16, 2021, Kim reprised his role as Detective Lee Jong-ryeol, opposite veteran actor Jung Woong-in, in special encore play Ice, as second performance of "2021 Play Ten Thousand Won Series", at Seongnam Arts Center.

In August 2021, he starred in the tvN drama Hometown Cha-Cha-Cha alongside Shin Min-a, where he played an officially unemployed but all-around handyman in a seaside village of Gongjin. Aired on tvN and Netflix, the series was both a domestic and international hit with audience ratings peaking at 13.322% and went on to become one of the highest-rated television series in Korean cable television history. In September 2021, during Hometown Cha-Cha-Cha's airing, Kim once again topped Korean Business Research Institute's brand reputation ranking index. According to Good Data Corporation, Kim topped actor category in TV Topicality from 3rd week of August to the 4th week of September, from 1st to 2nd week of October, and ranked second in the 5th week of September 2021.

In December 2021, he ranked first place in Gallup Korea's Television Actor of the Year. He also started to film his first debut feature film, directed by Park Hoon-jung, The Childe. The first script reading was held on December 3, 2021 and principal photography began on December 10, 2021.

In May 2022, it was announced that Kim will return to the theater with the third work of The 9th Best Plays Festival, play Touching the Void by David Greig. It is based on the true story of the survival of two British mountain climbers, Joe Simpson and Simon Yates. The Korean premiere, directed by Kim Dong-yeon, was performed at Art One Theater 2 in Daehangno from July 8 to September 18, 2022. According to Interpark, tickets for the performances starring Kim in theater of 250 seats capacity were all sold out. Later, Kim donated the full amount of his theater fee.

In January 2023, film distributor Acemaker Movieworks stated that the principal photography of Tyrant began on January 2nd. Kim starred opposite Cha Seung-won and Kim Kang-woo in a neo-noir action film directed by Park Hoon-jung.

Endorsements 
Following his rise in popularity in 2020, Kim has been chosen as the face of various brands in South Korea and Southeast Asia. His endorsements have included clothing, electronics, cosmetics, food, e-commerce and more. Some of the brands endorsed by Kim achieved record sales in 2021; this has been labelled "The Kim Seon-Ho Effect", attributed to his rapid rise in popularity both in Korea and internationally.

In the end of May, 2021, Kim appeared in special video of the "2021 P4G Seoul Summit," South Korea's first environment multi-lateral summit. In the video, Kim introduces venture company's solar panel support project in Africa. It was released on Naver TV, KakaoTV and YouTube Channel of Korea Blue House.

Public image 
On October 17, 2021, a user who said she was the ex-girlfriend of "Actor K" (later revealed to be Kim) made allegations on a Korean internet forum that the actor had coerced her into getting an abortion while the two were dating. On October 20, 2021, in light of his ex-girlfriend's claims, he issued a public apology through his agency. As the ex-girlfriend's claims gathered public attention, advertisers quickly pulled their advertisements featuring Kim, which according to Korea's Daily, included popular international brands such as an American pizza restaurant chain and a Japanese camera brand. Kim stepped down from the permanent cast of the KBS variety show 2 Days & 1 Night, and subsequently withdrew from film projects Dog Days and Lee Sang-geun's romantic comedy 2 O'Clock Date.

On October 20, 2021, Kim's ex-girlfriend issued a new statement, stating that there were some misunderstandings between them and that she had received an apology from him. She also apologised for causing unintentional damage. On October 26, 2021, a Korean media outlet published new evidence challenging the accusations of Kim's ex-girlfriend, citing sources from close acquaintances of both Kim and his ex-girlfriend, with reports stating that the abortion decision was mutual, and that the pair broke up after questionable circumstances surrounding the ex-girlfriend. Following the new reports, seven companies resumed advertisements featuring Kim. The production team of the film Sad Tropics also announced their decision to proceed with their project and list Kim as the lead actor.

Philanthropy 
On January 27, 2021, his agency  confirmed that he donated 100 million won (approximately $90,300) to the Korea Childhood Leukemia Foundation. His agency stated, "In return for the support and love he received from many people, he donated with the hope that it might be even a bit of help for children and their families who are going through a hard time." In September 2021, he partnered with Marco Rojo for the 'Happy Bean Special Funding' project raising money for better residential conditions for the elderly. Three days after the opening of the fund on September 3, the fundraising surpassed 100 million won, exceeding the target amount by 3600%. In December 2021, he quietly donated 50 million won to the Korea Leukemia Children's Foundation. The donation was not disclosed, because of Kim Seon-ho's request. His agency also declined to comment and stated, "I know it was done personally because he wanted to be of some help."

In September 2022, Kim donated the full amount of his theater fee from play Touching the Void to help the victims of Typhoon Hinnamnor by donating through The Hope Bridge Korea Disaster Relief Association.

Filmography

Film

Television series

Television show

Music video

Stage

Theater

Musical concert

Discography

Singles

Awards and nominations

Listicles

Notes

References

External links 

  

1986 births
Living people
21st-century South Korean male actors
Male actors from Seoul
Seoul Institute of the Arts alumni
South Korean male stage actors
South Korean male television actors
South Korean male film actors
South Korean television personalities